Brackenridgea zanguebarica, the yellow peeling plane, is a species of plant in the family Ochnaceae. It is native to the southeastern Afrotropics. The bark of the tree is locally in high demand for traditional medicine.

Range
It occurs in Kenya, Tanzania, Malawi, Mozambique, Zimbabwe and very locally in South Africa, where it is endangered.

References

Ochnaceae
Taxa named by Daniel Oliver